Mishel is a surname and given name, related to the names Michel and Michelle.

Notable people with the surname include:
Dave Mishel (1905–1975), American football player
Lawrence Mishel, American economist

Notable people with the given name include:
Mishel Al-Agmi (born 1992), Saudi Arabian footballer
Mishel Bilibashi (born 1989), Albanian footballer